Mohamed Bouzoubaa (born 1939, Meknes – died 16 November 2007) was a Moroccan politician of the Socialist Union of Popular Forces party. He was Minister of Justice in the cabinet of Driss Jettou (2002–2007) and Minister of Relations with the Parliament in the cabinet of Abderrahman el-Yousfi (1998–2002). He was a founding member of the National Union of Popular Forces.

See also
Cabinet of Morocco

References

Government ministers of Morocco
1939 births
People from Meknes
National Union of Popular Forces politicians
2007 deaths